Rafael Matos and David Vega Hernández defeated Simone Bolelli and Fabio Fognini in the final, 6–4, 3–6, [13–11] to win the men's doubles tennis title at the 2022 Swedish Open.

Sander Arends and David Pel were the reigning champions, but chose not to defend their title.

Seeds

Draw

Draw

References

External links
 Main draw

Swedish Open - Men's doubles
2022 Men's doubles